West Albany is an unincorporated community in West Albany Township, Wabasha County, Minnesota, United States.

Geography
The community is located between Zumbro Falls and Wabasha along State Highway 60 (MN 60) near the intersection with 310th Avenue.  Spring Creek and West Albany Creek meet at West Albany.  The Zumbro River is nearby. Nearby places include Millville, Lake City, Zumbro Falls, Theilman, and Wabasha.

History
West Albany was platted in 1857, and named after Albany, New York, the native home of a large share of the first settlers. A post office called West Albany was established in 1857, and remained in operation until 1881.

References

Unincorporated communities in Minnesota
Unincorporated communities in Wabasha County, Minnesota
Rochester metropolitan area, Minnesota
1857 establishments in Minnesota Territory
Populated places established in 1857